Bullsone is an automotive products company headquartered in Seoul, Korea.

Its products include total fuel system cleaners, engine oil treatments, car shampoos, car waxes, rain repellents, the wide mirror, and air fresheners.

Brands

 Bullsoneshot, a fuel system cleaner, is the main product of Bullsone.
 Grasse, it is the brand name for luxury car perfume series.
 Rain OK is the brand name for glass care products.
 Crystal and Lunatic are for surface care products.
 BalanceOn is the brand for healthe care products

Concept
Bullsone Co., Ltd. began as an independent entity in 2001, branching off from Oxy Co., Ltd., a leading Korean enterprise. Since then it has developed into Korea's No. 1 auto care products manufacturer. The following are factors that contributed to Bullsone's success: corporate philosophy that gives priority to the trust of customers, competitive spirit that does not accept failure, cultivation of creative minds with a desire to always pursue something new. Bullsone, in particular, has been preparing for a sustainable future by actively developing products based on the idea of low-carbon green growth. As a result, it has laid the foundation to expand its business into the global market and become a global company.

Products
 Engine care
 Total fuel system cleaner (Bullsoneshot) 
 Oil treatment: Engine coating treatment (Bullspower)
 Air intake system cleaner
 Engine degreaser
 Multi purpose lubricant
 Antifreeze / Coolant
 Water remover
 Wide mirror
 Surface care
 Car shampoo for self washing and washing shop
 Coating 
 Premium carnauba wax
 Foaming shampoo 
 Tire coating gel
 Tire shine
 Wheel clean&shine
 Leather cleaner
 Leather lotion
 Scratch remover
 Compound
 Sticker & tar remover
 Bug cleaner
 Glass care
 Rain repellent
 Washer fluid
 Ultimate glass clean
 Deicer
 Anti-fog
 Wiper blade
 Air care
 Air fresheners (Grasse, Pola family)
 Deodorizers (Saladdin)
 Diffuser lines (Objet) for Car & Home

See also
 Auto parts
 Economy of South Korea

References

External links
 Bullsone Homepage in Korean
 Bullsone Homepage in English
 Bullsone Homepage in Persian
 Bullsone Homepage in Ukraine

Chemical companies of South Korea
Automotive companies of South Korea
Companies based in Seoul
Companies established in 2001
South Korean brands